() is a 1991 Japanese film directed by Takao Okawara.

Production
Prior to working on Chōshōjo Reiko, director Takao Okawara worked as an assistant director at Toho often pitching ideas for a script that were ignored. Okawara decided to develop a story and enter it into a competition and if he would win, it would get better attention from upper staff at Toho. Okawara developed a story that he stated had a "sellable script" aimed at teenage audiences which persuaded him to include a fantasy element of Extrasensory perception. He submitted his story to the Kido Awards which it won second place. This influenced Toho to allow Okawara to direct it.

The film's cast included Arisa Mizuki who was an unknown actress at the time and would be known as a super model by 2000. Okawara described the shooting of the film as difficult, stating that the film's low budget did not allow him to have a special effects director for the film, making him do both.

Release
Chōshōjo Reiko was distributed theatrically in Japan by Toho on November 16, 1991. Norman England of Fangoria stated the film failed to find an audience in Japan referring to it as a "box-office dud." The film's producer Shogo Tomiyama felt that despite the film not being strong in the box office, he thought the film was good enough that they would allow Okawara to direct later films in the Godzilla film series.

Arisa Mizuki won the "Newcomer of the Year" award at the Japanese Academy Awards for her role in the film.

See also
 List of Japanese films of 1991

References

Footnotes

Sources

External links
 

Toho films
1990s Japanese films